Gerald John "Jerry" Popek (September 22, 1946 – July 20, 2008) was an American computer scientist, known for his research on operating systems and virtualization.

With Robert P. Goldberg he proposed the Popek and Goldberg virtualization requirements, a set of conditions necessary for a computer architecture to support system virtualization.

Academia
Born in Passaic, New Jersey Popek graduated from Rutherford High School in Rutherford, New Jersey in 1964, where he was the class valedictorian. He graduated from New York University in 1968 with a B.S. in Nuclear Engineering.
In 1970 he completed an M.S. in Applied Mathematics from Harvard University. In 1973 he completed a Ph.D, also in Applied Mathematics, at Harvard and moved to UCLA. At UCLA he worked on virtualisation, network security, reliable operating systems and Databases. He became Director of the Center for Experimental Computer Science.

Around 1980 he worked on the LOCUS distributed operating system, an early implementation of the single-system image idea.

Between April 1981 and June 1983 Popek served on the DARPA "steering committee" for BSD UNIX formed by Duane Adams of DARPA to guide the design work leading to 4.2BSD. Other members of the committee were Bob Fabry, Bill Joy and Sam Leffler from UCB, Alan Nemeth and Rob Gurwitz from BBN, Dennis Ritchie from Bell Labs, Keith Lantz from Stanford, Rick Rashid from Carnegie-Mellon, Bert Halstead from MIT and Dan Lynch from ISI.

Commercial
In order to pursue the commercial opportunities of LOCUS he formed the Locus Computing Corporation in 1982, taking on the roles
of Chief technical officer and Chairman.
In 1995 Locus was acquired by Platinum Technology Inc. in a share swap. Dr Popek took on the role of CTO of Platinum.
In 1999 he left Platinum to become CTO of CarsDirect.com, "the first Internet car company"
In 2000 he left CarsDirect.com to join NetZero also as CTO
In 2001 NetZero merged with its competitor Juno to form United Online Inc. and Dr Popek became Executive Vice President and CTO of the new company.

Awards
In June 2009 he was posthumously awarded the 2009 USENIX Lifetime Achievement Award.

References

External links
 In Memoriam: Gerald J. Popek

American computer businesspeople
American computer scientists
Polytechnic Institute of New York University alumni
Harvard School of Engineering and Applied Sciences alumni
University of California, Los Angeles faculty
1947 births
2008 deaths
American chief technology officers
People from Passaic, New Jersey
People from Rutherford, New Jersey
Rutherford High School (New Jersey) alumni